Engineering Council of India (ECI) is a statutory professional body responsible for regulation and licensing of engineering profession in India. It is under the ownership of Ministry of Science and Technology, Government of India It was established on 4 April 2002 by Government of India to work for the advancement of engineering profession in various disciplines and for enhancing the image of engineers in society, by focusing on the quality and accountability of engineers. The headquarters of ECI is in New Delhi, India. Today there are 44 members, which includes eight government departments, 32 engineering research units, 03 national apex bodies and 28 provincial apex bodies.

National Apex Bodies
Indian Institutes of Technology

Mentoring Bodies and Research Units 

 Niti Aayog
 Indian Institution of Industrial Engineering
 All India Council For Technical Education (AICTE)
 Indian Institution of Plant Engineers
 National Board of Accreditation (NBA)
 Indian National Group of the IABSE
 Central Public Works Department (Ministry of Urban Development)
 Indian Society For Non-Destructive Testing
 Department of Commerce, Ministry of Commerce & Industry
 Indian Society For Technical Education
 Department of Secondary and Higher Education, Ministry of HRD
 Indian Society For Trenchless Technology
 Department of Scientific and Industrial Research, Council of Scientific & Industrial Research
 Indian Society of Agriculture Engineers
 Indian National Academy of Engineers	
 Institute of Urban Transport (India)
 Association of Consulting Civil Engineers (India)
 Institution of Mechanical Engineers (India)
 Broadcast Engineering Society (India)	
 International Council of Consultants
 Computer Society of India
 Mining Engineers' Association of India
 Consultancy Development Centre
 The Aeronautical Society of India
 Construction Industry Development Council
 The Automobile Society (India)
 Consulting Engineers Association of India
 The Indian Institute of Metals
 Indian Association of Structural Engineers
 The Institute of Electrical & Electronics Engineers, Inc., India Council
 Indian Buildings Congress	
 The Institute of Marine Engineers (India)
 Indian Concrete Institute
 The Institution of Civil Engineers (India)
 Indian Geotechnical Society
 The Institution of Electronics and Telecommunications Engineers
 Indian Institute of Chemical Engineers
 The Institution of Surveyors	
 Indian Institution of Bridge Engineers
 The Council of Engineering and Technology (India)

References

External links 
Official site

Organisations based in Delhi
Professional associations based in India